The Republic of Baja California and Sonora or more simply known as the Republic of Sonora was a short-lived, unrecognized federal republic ruled by filibuster William Walker in 1854. It was based in Baja California and also claimed (but never controlled) Sonora. Walker's exploits generated interest back in San Francisco, where bonds for the Republic of Sonora were sold, and its flag was even raised in places. His enterprise, however, suffered from a lack of supplies and discontent from within; resistance by the Mexican government quickly forced Walker to retreat.

History

In the summer of 1853, an American adventurer and filibuster named William Walker traveled to Guaymas seeking a grant from the government of Mexico to create a colony that would serve as a fortified frontier, protecting US soil from raids by Native Americans.  Mexico refused, and Walker returned to San Francisco determined to obtain his colony anyway.  He began recruiting American supporters of slavery and Manifest Destiny, mostly inhabitants of Kentucky and Tennessee.  His proposed buffer colony turned into plans to establish the independent Republic of Sonora as a part of the American Union, like the Republic of Texas. He funded his project by "selling scripts which were redeemable in lands of Sonora."

On October 15, 1853, Walker set out with 45 men to invade and conquer the Mexican territories of Baja California and Sonora. He succeeded in capturing La Paz, the capital of sparsely populated Baja California, and declared the Republic of Baja California, with himself as president and his partner, Henry P. Watkins, as vice president. He then put the region under the laws of the American state of Louisiana, where slavery remained legal in 1854. He declared independence from Mexico on January 10, 1854. Fearful of attacks by Mexico, Walker moved his position twice over the next three months, first to Cabo San Lucas, and then further north to Ensenada to maintain a more secure position of operations.  He never gained control of Sonora but three months later, he pronounced Baja California part of a larger Republic of Sonora.

Walker's exploits generated large amounts of interest back in San Francisco, where bonds for the Republic of Sonora were sold and its flag was even raised in places. However, Walker was never able to take advantage of his project's popularity. A serious lack of supplies, discontent within his party and an unexpectedly strong resistance by the Mexican government quickly forced Walker to retreat.

Back in California, Walker was put on trial for conducting an illegal war. The judge indicated that Walker was guilty of violating the peace treaty agreed upon by the United States and Mexico after the Mexican–American War (1846–48). However, it was the era of Manifest Destiny, and, consequently, his filibustering project was popular in the southern and western United States. Because of this, the jury took only eight minutes to acquit him.

See also
 Crabb Massacre
 Historical outline of Arizona
 Sonora
 Gadsden Purchase
 Arizona Territory (Confederate States of America)
 Traditional Arizona
 Golden Circle (proposed country)
 History of Honduras

References

External links
 San Francisco Museum
 Flags of the World

States and territories established in 1853
States and territories disestablished in 1854
Separatism in Mexico
Sonora
Sonora
Sonora, Republic of
Former countries in North America
History of Baja California
History of Baja California Sur
History of Sonora
Independent Mexico
1853 establishments in Mexico
1854 disestablishments in Mexico